Eleuterio Maisonnave y Cutayar (6 September 1840 in Alicante, Spain – 5 May 1890 in Madrid, Spain) was a Spanish politician who served as minister of state in 1873 during the presidency of Francisco Pi y Margall in the First Spanish Republic. In 1885 he bought a daily newspaper, El Globo, based in Madrid.

References

www.xtec.es Eleuterio Maisonnave

External links

|-
 

1840 births
1890 deaths
People from Alicante
Foreign ministers of Spain
Government ministers during the First Spanish Republic